The following is a list of equipment in the Republic of Union of Myanmar Navy. It may not be up-to-date or complete.

Fleets 

 1st Fleet (Thanlyin, Yangon) 
 2nd Fleet (Heinze)	
 3rd Fleet (Kyaukphyu)	
 4th Fleet (Haigyi)

Submarines

Active ships

Landing platform dock (LPD)

Frigates

Corvettes

Fast attack craft (Missile)

Fast attack craft (Gun)

Fast attack craft (Submarine chasers)

Offshore patrol vessels (OPV)

Inshore patrol vessels (IPV)

River patrol craft

Fast patrol craft

Torpedo boats

Minesweepers

Hospital ships

Troop transports/Troop carriers

Landing Craft Utility (LCU)

Landing Craft Medium (LCM)

Landing Craft Tank (LCT)

Survey ships

Coastal logistics and tanker ships

Tugboats

Floating dry dock

Unmanned surface vehicle (USV)

Aircraft

Naval aviation

Weapons

Missiles

Torpedoes

References 

Sources

Lists of ships by country
Navy
Equipment
Lists of armies (navy forces) equipment
Navy Equipment